B minor is a minor scale based on B, consisting of the pitches B, C, D, E, F, G, and A. Its key signature has two sharps. Its relative major is D major and its parallel major is B major.

The B natural minor scale is:

Changes needed for the melodic and harmonic versions of the scale are written in with accidentals as necessary. The B harmonic minor and melodic minor scales are:

Christian Friedrich Daniel Schubart (1739–1791) regarded B minor as a key expressing a quiet acceptance of fate and very gentle complaint, something commentators find to be in line with Bach's use of the key in his St John Passion. By the end of the Baroque era, however, conventional academic views of B minor had shifted: Composer-theorist Francesco Galeazzi (1758–1819) opined that B minor was not suitable for music in good taste. Beethoven labelled a B-minor melodic idea in one of his sketchbooks as a "black key".

Notable compositions in B minor 

 Johann Sebastian Bach
 Mass in B minor
 Orchestral Suite No. 2, BWV 1067
 Prelude and Fugue in B minor, BWV 544
 French Suite No. 3, BWV 814
 Flute Sonata in B minor, BWV 1030
 Johannes Brahms
 Clarinet Quintet
 Alexander Borodin
 Symphony No. 2
 Frédéric Chopin
 Scherzo No. 1, Op. 20
 Étude, Op. 25, No. 10
 Prelude in B minor "Tolling Bells", Op. 28, No. 6
 Piano Sonata No. 3, Op. 58
 Waltz, Op. 69, No. 2
 Antonín Dvořák
 Cello Concerto, Op. 104
 Johann Nepomuk Hummel
 Piano Concerto No. 3, Op. 89
 Franz Liszt
 Piano Sonata
 Wolfgang Amadeus Mozart
 Adagio, K. 540
 Niccolò Paganini
 Violin Concerto No. 2, Op. 7
Sergei Rachmaninoff
 Moments musicaux No. 3, Op. 16
 Prelude in B minor, Op. 32, No. 10 
 Études-Tableaux No. 4 in B minor, Op. 39
 Camille Saint-Saëns
 Violin Concerto No. 3, Op. 61
 Franz Schubert
 Symphony No. 8 (Unfinished), D. 759
 Alexander Scriabin
 Fantaisie in B minor, Op. 28 
 Pyotr Ilyich Tchaikovsky
 Symphony No. 6 (Pathetique), Op. 74

See also
Key (music)
Major and minor
Chord (music)
Chord names and symbols (popular music)

References 
Notes

Sources
 See also Francesco Galeazzi, The Theoretical-Practical Elements of Music, Parts III and IV; English translation, with introduction and commentary, by Deborah Burton and Gregory W. Harwood (Champaign, Illinois: University of Illinois Press, 2012); .

External links

Musical keys
Minor scales